Gopalakrishna Pai is an Indian author who writes fiction and non-fiction books in the Kannada language.

Pai has received the Karnataka Sahitya Academic award, Centre's Kendra Sahitya Academi Award.

Pai is the author of the book Swapna Saraswata.

References

Year of birth missing (living people)
Living people
Kannada-language writers
20th-century Indian novelists
Novelists from Karnataka
Best Adapted Screenplay National Film Award winners
Recipients of the Sahitya Akademi Award in Kannada